The Commander-in-Chief, The Nore, was an operational commander of the Royal Navy. His subordinate units, establishments, and staff were sometimes informally known as the Nore Station or Nore Command. The Nore is a sandbank at the mouth of the  Thames Estuary and River Medway.

History

The origins of the Commander-in-Chief's post can be traced to the first area naval commander, then known as the Commander-in-Chief, Thames from 1695 to 1696.

From 1698 to 1699 the appointment was known as Commander-in-Chief, Medway. In 1707 the post holder was known as Commander-in-Chief, Thames and Medway and between 1711 and 1745 the office was known as the Commander-in-Chief, Thames, Medway and Nore. In 1745 the post for the first time was simply called the Commander-in-Chief, Nore established at Chatham and became responsible for sub-commands at Chatham, London less the Admiralty, Sheerness, Harwich and Humber. A. Cecil Hampshire writes that in 1752 Isaac Townsend, Admiral of the Blue, was appointed as "Commander-in-Chief of HM Ships and Naval Vessels in the Rivers Thames and Medway and at the Buoy of the Nore."

From 1827 the Commander-in-Chief was accommodated in Admiralty House, Sheerness, built as part of the renewal of Sheerness Dockyard. From 1834 to 1899 his appointment was known as the Commander-in-Chief, Sheerness.

After the dissolution of the Home Fleet in 1905, remaining ships at a lesser state of readiness were split between three reserve divisions: Nore Division plus the Devonport Division and the Portsmouth Division. In 1909 the division was brought out of reserve status, and became operational as part of the 3rd and 4th Division of the Home Fleet.

In 1907 the Commander-in-Chief moved to a new Admiralty House alongside the naval barracks (HMS Pembroke) in Chatham, the Sheerness house being given over to the Commander-in-Chief, Home Fleet. The Dover Patrol, Harwich Force, and Humber Force operated in the Channel during the First World War, but were responsible to the Admiralty in London; the Nore was effectively a provider of shore support rather than a command with operational responsibilities.

In 1938 an underground Area Combined Headquarters was built close to Admiralty House to accommodate the Commander-in-Chief together with the Air Officer Commanding No. 16 Group RAF, Coastal Command, and their respective staffs; similar headquarters were built close to the other Royal Dockyards. During the Second World War, the Nore assumed great importance: it was used to guard the east coast convoys supplying the ports of North Eastern England.

During the Second World War, the Commander-in-Chief at the Nore, at Chatham, included eight sub commands, each of which usually commanded by a Flag Officer either a Rear Admiral or Vice Admiral. They included Brightlingsea station, Harwich, Humber, London (not including the Admiralty), Lowestoft, Sheerness, Southend and Yarmouth.  These sub-commands were then sub-divided into Base areas usually commanded by a Naval Officer in Charge (NOIC) or a Residential Naval Officer (RNO) these included HM Naval Bases at Boston, Burnham-on-Crouch, Felixstowe, Gravesend, Grimsby, Immingham, and Queensborough.

With the onset of the Cold War, the Nore diminished in importance as the navy decreased in size.  Between 1952 and 1961 the Commander-in-Chief, The Nore was double-hatted as Commander, Nore Sub-Area, of NATO's Allied Command Channel.

Cecil Hampshire writes that the appointment of Commander-in-Chief finally lapsed as part of the "Way Ahead" economies. The closing ceremony took place on 24 March 1961, when the station's Queen's Colour was formally laid up in the presence of members of the Admiralty Board, several former Commanders-in-Chief, other civilian and military figures, "..and the Commander-in-Chief of the Netherlands Home Station flying his flag in the new Dutch destroyer Limburg who had been invited to attend." The Commander-in-Chief's appointment was finally discontinued on 31 March 1961. Cecil Hampshire writes that from 1 April 1961, the area was divided between the Commander-in-Chief Portsmouth and the Flag Officer Scotland and Northern Ireland, the demarcation line being "roughly at The Wash." For purposes of administration from that date onward, the Admiral Superintendent Chatham also took the title of Flag Officer Medway.

The underground headquarters went on to serve as HMS Wildfire, a Royal Naval Reserve training and communications centre, from 1964 to 1994.

Installations

Chatham 
Chatham Dockyard was a Dockyard located on the River Medway in Kent. Established in Chatham in the mid-16th century, the dockyard subsequently expanded into neighbouring Gillingham. At its most extensive, in the early 20th century, two-thirds of the dockyard lay in Gillingham, one-third in Chatham. The senior officer was a Captain-Superintendent, Chatham Dockyard or the Admiral-superintendent Chatham

In the early 20th century the Rear Admiral Commanding, Chatham Sheerness Reserve Division, was established and became responsible eventually to the Commander-in-Chief, Home Fleet(s). Post holders included Rear Admirals Walter Hodgson Bevan Graham, 3 January 1905 – 3 January 1906; Charles H. Adair 3 January 1906 – 3 January 1907; and Frank Finnis 3 January 1907 – 4 January 1909.

The Royal Naval Barracks, Chatham were purpose-built to provide accommodation and training facilities for the men of the reserve fleet who were waiting to be appointed to ships. Designed by Colonel Henry Pilkington, construction of the barracks began in 1897 and completed in December 1902.

Sheerness Dockyard
Sheerness Dockyard was a Royal Navy Dockyard located on the Sheerness peninsula, at the mouth of the River Medway in Kent. It was opened in the 1660s and closed in 1960.

It was directed by the Admiral-Superintendent, Sheerness.

Sub-areas during First and Second World Wars 
At various times during the First and Second World Wars, up to nine sub-areas were established. These were usually administered by either a retired vice or rear admiral, or an active captain, who were appointed as Senior Naval Officers or Flag Officers.<ref name="Niehorster 2016"

Other installations:

Seagoing formations 
Various units that served in this command included:

Commanders-in-Chief
Commanders-in-Chief have included:
  = died in post

Commander-in-Chief Thames (1695–1696)
 Commodore Stafford Fairborne 1695
 Commodore James Gother 1696

Commander-in-Chief, Medway, (1698–1699)
 Captain John Jennings (1698) 
 Admiral Sir Cloudesley Shovell (1698–1699)

Commander-in-Chief, Thames and Medway, (1706–1711)
 Captain Robert Fairfax (1706)
 Vice-Admiral Sir John Jennings (1708)

Commander-in-Chief, Thames, Medway and Nore, (1711–1747)
 Rear-Admiral Sir Thomas Hardy (1711–1712) 
 Captain George St Lo (1712–1714)
 Captain John Balchen (1716)
 Rear-Admiral William Caldwell (1717) 
 Captain Nicholas Haddock (1732)
 Admiral Sir George Walton (1734–1735)
 Commodore Charles Brown (1741)
 Commodore Christopher O'Brien (1742–1743)
 Commodore Charles Cotterell (1744–1745)
 Commodore Thomas Smith (1745)
 Admiral Sir Chaloner Ogle (1745–1746)
 Commodore Edward Boscawen (1746)
 Vice-Admiral Perry Mayne (1746–1747)

Commander-in-Chief, Medway and at the Nore, (1747–1797)
 Rear-Admiral Henry Osborn  (1747–1748)
 Commodore Temple West (1748)
 Commodore George Townshend (1748–1749)
 Admiral Isaac Townsend (1752)
 Commodore Francis Geary (1757–1758) 
 Commodore William Boys (1759–1761) 
 Commodore William Gordon (1762–1765) 
 Commodore William Saltern Willett (1766–1769) 
 Commodore Christopher Hill (1770)
 Rear-Admiral Sir Peter Denis (1771)
 Commodore George Mackenzie (1774–1775)
 Commodore Sir Edward Vernon (1775–1776)
 Rear-Admiral John Campbell (1778)
 Vice-Admiral Robert Roddam (1778–1783) 
 Commodore Sir Walter Stirling (1783–1785)
 Commodore Sir Andrew Hamond (1785–1788) 
 Vice-Admiral Richard Edwards (1788) 
 Commodore Skeffington Lutwidge (1788–1789)
 Commodore Thomas Pasley (1789–1791)
 Commodore William Locker (1792)
 Commodore George Murray (1792–1793)
 Vice-Admiral John Dalrymple (1793–1795)
 Vice-Admiral Sir George Collier (1795)
 Vice-Admiral Charles Buckner (1795–1797)

Commander-in-Chief, Nore, (1797–1834)
Post holders included:
 Vice-Admiral Skeffington Lutwidge (1797–1798)
 Vice-Admiral Sir Thomas Pasley (1798–1799)
 Vice-Admiral Alexander Graeme (1799–1803)
 Vice-Admiral Lord Keith (1803–1807) (formed part of North Sea Command)
 Vice-Admiral Thomas Wells (1807–1810)
 Vice-Admiral Sir Henry Stanhope (1810–1811)
 Vice-Admiral Sir Thomas Williams (1811–1814)
 Vice-Admiral Sir Charles Rowley (1815–1818)
 Vice-Admiral Sir John Gore (1818–1821)
 Vice-Admiral Sir Benjamin Hallowell (1821–1824)
 Vice-Admiral Sir Robert Moorsom (1824)
 Vice-Admiral Sir Henry Blackwood (1827–1830)
 Vice-Admiral Sir John Beresford (1830–1833)
 Vice-Admiral Sir Richard King (1833–1834)

Commander-in-Chief, Sheerness, (1834–1899)
Post holders included:
 Vice-Admiral Charles Elphinstone Fleeming (1834–1837)
 Vice-Admiral Sir Robert Otway (1837–1840)
 Vice-Admiral Sir Henry Digby (1840–1841)
 Vice-Admiral Sir Edward Brace (1841–1843) 
 Vice-Admiral Sir John White (1844–1845) 
 Vice-Admiral Sir Edward Durnford King (1845–1848)
 Vice-Admiral Sir George Elliot (1848–1851)
 Vice-Admiral Josceline Percy (1851–1854)
 Vice-Admiral William Gordon (1854–1857)
 Vice-Admiral Sir Edward Harvey (1857–1860)
 Vice-Admiral Sir William Hope-Johnstone (1860–1863)
 Vice-Admiral Sir George Lambert (1863–1864)
 Vice-Admiral Sir Charles Talbot (1864–1866)
 Vice-Admiral Sir Baldwin Walker (1866–1869)
 Vice-Admiral Richard Warren (1869–1870)
 Vice-Admiral Sir Charles Elliot (1870–1873)
 Vice-Admiral George Hastings (1873–1876)
 Vice-Admiral Sir Henry Chads (1876–1877)
 Vice-Admiral Sir William King-Hall (1877–1879)
 Vice-Admiral Sir Reginald Macdonald (1879–1882)
 Vice-Admiral Sir Edward Rice (1882–1884)
 Vice-Admiral Sir John Corbett (1884–1885)
 Vice-Admiral The Prince of Leiningen (1885–1887)
 Vice-Admiral Charles Waddilove (1887–1888)
 Vice-Admiral Thomas Lethbridge (1888–1890)
 Vice-Admiral Charles Curme (1890–1892) 
 Vice-Admiral Sir Algernon Heneage (1892–1894)
 Vice-Admiral Sir Richard Wells (1894–1896)
 Vice-Admiral Sir Henry Nicholson (1896–1897)
 Vice-Admiral Sir Charles Hotham (1897–1899)

Commander-in-Chief, Nore,  (1899–1961)
Post holders included:
 Vice-Admiral Sir Nathaniel Bowden-Smith (1899–1900)
 Vice-Admiral Sir William Kennedy (1900–1901)
 Vice-Admiral Sir Albert Markham (1901–1903)
 Admiral Sir Hugo Pearson (1903–1907)
 Admiral Sir Gerard Noel (1907–1908)
 Admiral Sir Charles Drury (1908–1911)
 Admiral Sir Richard Poore (1911–1915)
 Admiral Sir George Callaghan (1915–1918)
 Admiral Sir Doveton Sturdee (1918–1921)
 Admiral Sir Hugh Evan-Thomas (1921–1924)
 Vice Admiral Sir William Goodenough (1924–1927)
 Admiral Sir Edwyn Alexander-Sinclair (1927–1930)
 Admiral Sir Reginald Tyrwhitt (1930–1933)
 Vice Admiral Sir Hugh Tweedie (1933–1935)
 Vice Admiral Sir Edward Evans (1935–1939)
 Admiral Sir Studholme Brownrigg (January 1939 – December 1939)
 Admiral Sir Reginald Plunkett (1939–1941)
 Admiral Sir George Lyon (1941–1943)
 Admiral Sir John Tovey (1943–1946)
 Admiral Sir Harold Burrough (1946–1948)
 Admiral Sir Henry Moore (1948–1950)
 Admiral Sir Cecil Harcourt (1950–1952)
 Admiral Sir Cyril Douglas-Pennant (1952–1953)
 Admiral Sir Geoffrey Oliver (1953–1955)
 Admiral Sir Frederick Parham (1955–1958)
 Admiral Sir Robin Durnford-Slater (1958–1961)

Senior staff officers

Flag Captain, the Nore

Post holders supporting the senior naval officer at the Nore included:
 Captain William G. Luard: July 1860 – July 1863
 Captain John Fulford: July 1863 – April 1866
 Captain Donald McL. Mackenzie: April 1866 – June 1869
 Captain Thomas Miller: June 1869 – June 1870
 Captain John C. Wilson: June 1870 – January 1872
 Captain George W. Watson: January 1872 – January 1875
 Captain Charles T. Curme: January 1875 – February 1876
 Captain St. George C. D'Arcy-Irvine: February 1876 – September 1877
 Captain Thomas B. Lethbridge: September 1877 – January 1879
 Captain Thomas B.M. Sulivan: January 1879 – July 1881
 Captain John D’Arcy: July 1881 – September 1883
 Captain James A. Poland: September 1883 – September 1886
 Captain Frederick C.B. Robinson: September 1886 – July 1887
 Captain Arthur C. Curtis: July 1887 – July 1890
 Captain Leicester C. Keppel: July 1890 – August 1892
 Captain Henry H. Boys: August 1892 – October 1894
 Captain William H.C. St.Clair: October 1894 – February 1896
 Captain James L. Hammet: February 1896 – January 1898
 Captain William F.S. Mann: January 1898 – July 1899
 Captain Charles Campbell: July–October 1899
 Captain Henry C. Bigge: October 1899 – February 1901
 Captain Archibald Y. Pocklington: February 1901 – December 1902
 Captain Arthur Y. Moggridge: January 1907 – April 1908 
 Captain Clement Greatorex: April–December 1908 
 Captain Henry J. L. Clarke: December 1908 – August 1911 
 Captain Philip H. Colomb: August 1911 – January 1915 
 Captain Ernest A. Taylor: January 1915 – May 1916 
 Captain William Bowden-Smith: May–July 1916 
 Captain Alexander V. Campbell: July 1916 – April 1918 
 Captain Cecil M. Staveley: April–October 1918

Chief of Staff, the Nore

Post holders supporting the CINC, Nore included:
 Captain Theobald W.B. Kennedy: October 1918 – May 1921 
 Captain Wilfred Tomkinson: May 1921 – June 1923 
 Captain Herbert W.W. Hope: June 1923 – December 1924 
 Captain the Hon. William S. Leveson-Gower: December 1924 – May 1927 
 Captain the Hon. E. Barry S. Bingham: May 1927 – May 1929 
 Captain Douglas B. Le Mottee: May 1929 – May 1931 
 Captain Reginald V. Holt: May 1931 – August 1933 
 Captain Hector Boyes: August 1933 – November 1934 
 Captain Robert B. Ramsay: November 1934 – December 1935 
 Captain Reginald B. Darke: December 1935 – August 1937 
 Captain Philip Esmonde Phillips: August 1937 – July 1938 
 Captain the Hon. George Fraser: July 1938 – May 1940 
 Rear-Admiral Alfred H. Taylor: May 1940 – March 1943 
 Commodore George H. Creswell: March–October 1943 
 Commodore Robert G.H. Linzee: October 1943 – April 1946 
 Captain Albert L. Poland: April 1946 – July 1948 
 Captain Lennox A. K. Boswell: July 1948 – May 1949 
 Captain Arthur M. Knapp: May 1949 – June 1951 
 Captain Herbert F.H. Layman: June 1951 – January 1953 
 Captain Ronald E. Portlock: January 1953 – December 1954 
 Captain John A. W. Tothill: December 1954 – July 1956 
 Captain William A.F. Hawkins: July 1956 – December 1957 
 Captain Roger B.N. Hicks: December 1957 – April 1960 
 Captain Barry J. Anderson: April 1960 – March 1961

Offices under the Chief of Staff

Included:

Notes

External links
 Unit Histories, RN Nore
 British and Other Navies in World War 2 Day-by-Day by Don Kindell (Operational Units Active 1940)

N
Military units and formations established in 1752
Military units and formations disestablished in 1961
Military units and formations of the Royal Navy in World War I
Military units and formations of the Royal Navy in World War II